Air Santo Domingo (legally Aerolíneas Santo Domingo, S.A.) is the flag carrier airline of the Dominican Republic. It operated scheduled domestic services and flights to Haiti and Puerto Rico. It wet-leased additional aircraft from Servicios Aéreos Profesionales, which it used for ad hoc, on demand charter services to the United States.

History

The airline was established in 1996, wholly owned by Servicios Aéreos Profesionales (SAP). It flew to certain destinations in the Caribbean, to the United States and to Puerto Rico, covering routes to John F. Kennedy International Airport and Luis Muñoz Marín International Airport with one Boeing 727-200 and one Boeing 757-200 leased from TransMeridian Airlines. In 2005, Air Santo Domingo was merged into SAP.

As of 2020, the airline currently undertaking expansion plans, with SAP Group handling all operations for Air Santo Domingo.

Fleet

Current fleet
As of 2021, Air Santo Domingo owns a single BAe Jetstream 32 (registered HI856) used for charter flights.

Former fleet
Over the years, the airline operated the following types:

1 Beechcraft 1900 Leased from SAP Air
2 Boeing 727-200 Leased from TransMeridian Airlines
1 Boeing 757-200 Leased from TransMeridian Airlines
1 Cessna 208 Caravan Operated by SAP Air
4 Let L-410 UVP-E One owned, the others were leased from SAP Air
1 Saab 340B Operated by SAP Air
2 Short 360 Leased from SAP Air

See also
List of airlines of the Dominican Republic

References

External links

https://www.facebook.com/flyairsantodomingo

Airlines established in 1996
Airlines of the Dominican Republic